Parodi  is a village in Ashti Taluka, Beed District, Aurangabad Division, Maharashtra, India.

Demographics 
In the 2001 census, the village of Parodi had 1,084 inhabitants, with 555 males (51.2%) and 529 females (48.8%), for a gender ratio of 953 females per thousand males.

Notes

External links 
 
  (in English)

Villages in Beed district